Namık Kemal Halat (born 5 July 1971) is a Turkish football coach and former player who last worked as the head coach of German club CFC Hertha 06.

Playing career
Halat started his senior career with Berlin Türkspor 1965. In 1994, he signed for Kocaelispor in the Turkish Süper Lig, where he made eighteen appearances in all competitions and scored one goal. After that, he played for Nürnberg, Gütersloh 2000, Fortuna Düsseldorf, VfL Osnabrück, Türkiyemspor Berlin, Berliner AK 07, Berliner Dynamo, Füchse Berlin Reinickendorf, and SV Yeşilyurt.

References

External links
 
 BAK Sports Director Halat: Via Liberia to Berlin
 Halat: "We want to, but don't have to go up" 
 Kemal Halat in conversation 
 Interview with Kemal Halat (sports director Berliner AK 07) 
 "We have a young team"

Living people
1971 births
Turkish footballers
Turkish football managers
People from Tunceli
Association football defenders
BFC Preussen players
Füchse Berlin Reinickendorf players
Kocaelispor footballers
1. FC Nürnberg players
FC Gütersloh 2000 players
Fortuna Düsseldorf players
VfL Osnabrück players
Türkiyemspor Berlin players
Berliner AK 07 players
Berliner FC Dynamo players
SV Yeşilyurt players
2. Bundesliga players
Regionalliga players
Oberliga (football) players
Süper Lig players
Turkish expatriate footballers
Turkish expatriate football managers
Expatriate footballers in Germany
Expatriate football managers in Germany
Turkish expatriate sportspeople in Germany
Expatriate football managers in Liberia
Expatriate football managers in Kenya
Expatriate football managers in Libya
Turkish expatriate sportspeople in Liberia
Turkish expatriate sportspeople in Libya
Turkish expatriate sportspeople in Kenya